The 1979–80 SK Rapid Wien season was the 82nd season in club history.

Squad

Squad and statistics

Squad statistics

Fixtures and results

League

Cup

UEFA Cup

References

1979-80 Rapid Wien Season
Rapid